Namco is a Japanese corporation best known as a producer of video games. Namco may also refer to:

Bandai Namco Entertainment, a merger between Namco and Bandai's game development departments
Bandai Namco Pictures, a Japanese animation studio split off from Sunrise
Namco (automobiles), a Greek automobile producer
Namco, Tibet, a town located about 100km north of Lhasa
Namtso, also called Namco, a salt lake in Tibet